The 2017 Mid-American Conference football season was the 72nd season for the Mid-American Conference (MAC) and part of the 2017 NCAA Division I FBS football season. The season began on August 31 and ended on November 25. The entire schedule was released on March 1. The Toledo Rockets won the conference championship game over the Akron Zips.

Previous season

Preseason

Preseason Poll
The Preseason poll was released at the MAC Media Day in Canton, Ohio.

East Division 
 Ohio Bobcats (11), 131
 Miami RedHawks (12), 129
 Bowling Green Falcons (1), 88
 Akron Zips, 79
 Buffalo Bulls, 41
 Kent State Golden Flashes, 36

West Division
 Toledo Rockets (22), 142
 Western Michigan Broncos (1), 107
 Northern Illinois Huskies (1), 89
 Eastern Michigan Eagles, 74
 Central Michigan Chippewas, 62
 Ball State Cardinals, 30

MAC Championship
The Toledo Rockets were selected as favorites to win the Mid-American Conference by receiving 21 of 24 votes. Others receiving one vote a piece were defending champions, Western Michigan Broncos, Bowling Green Falcons and Miami RedHawks.

Head coaches

Pre-season coaching changes

Schedule

Regular season

Week 1

Week 2

Week 3

Championship game

Week 14 (MAC Championship game)

Records against FBS conferences
2017 records against FBS conferences

Power–Five conferences and independents

Group of Five conferences

FCS Subdivision

Postseason

Postseason

Bowl games

(Rankings from final CFP Poll; All times EST)

Home game attendance

References